Mohamed Osama Ali Darwish (born 20 February 1997) is a Palestinian footballer who plays as a centre forward for the Palestine national team.

Club career
Born in Beit She'an, Darwish began his senior career in Germany with Hannover 96 II. On 31 August 2017, Darwish joined Oberliga Niedersachsen side Arminia Hannover. Seventeen days later, he made his debut in a 2–0 home win against Eintracht Northeim after being named in the starting line-up.

He moved to Hannoverscher SC for the 2019–20 season.

On 30 August 2020, Darwish joined Football Superleague of Kosovo side Trepça '89. On 18 September 2020, he made his debut in a 0–2 home defeat against Arbëria after being named in the starting line-up.

In November 2021 he signed for Atlas Delmenhorst. His early performances were praised by local media.

International career
On 31 August 2015, Darwish made his senior debut with Palestine in a friendly match against Lebanon after being named in the starting line-up.

On 31 December 2017, Darwish was named as part of the Palestine under-23 squad for 2018 AFC U-23 Championship. Ten days later, he made his debut with Palestine U23 in 2018 AFC U-23 Championship group stage against Japan U23 after coming on as a substitute at 60th minute in place of Shehab Qumbor.

References

1997 births
Living people
Footballers from Beit She'an
Palestinian footballers
Palestine international footballers
Association football forwards
Borussia Mönchengladbach players
FC Schalke 04 players
Hannover 96 II players
SV Arminia Hannover players
Hannoverscher SC players
KF Trepça'89 players
Atlas Delmenhorst players
Shabab Al-Khalil SC players
Haras El Hodoud SC players
Oberliga (football) players
Regionalliga players
Football Superleague of Kosovo players
West Bank Premier League players
Palestinian expatriate footballers
Expatriate footballers in Germany
Expatriate footballers in Kosovo
Expatriate footballers in Egypt
Palestinian expatriate sportspeople in Germany
Palestinian expatriate sportspeople in Kosovo
Palestinian expatriate sportspeople in Egypt
Palestine youth international footballers
Footballers at the 2018 Asian Games